The 2013–14 season was the 64th year for the Moroccan football club Raja Casablancas. In the previous season, from 2012–13 , the team won both of Morocco's domestic competitions. They won the Botola Pro title by finishing four points ahead of FAR Rabat, who finished second and 18 points ahead of their biggest rivals Wydad Casablanca, who finished third. They won the Coupe du Trône title by beating FAR Rabat 5–4 on penalties in the final after the first 120 minutes finished level at 0–0. Their season wasn't all glory as they lost in the UAFA Club Cup at the semi final stage, losing on away goals to Al-Arabi SC of Kuwait.

Players

First Team Squad

Transfers

In

Out

Competitions

Friendly Matches

Botola

League table

Results

Coupe du Trone

Round of 32

Round of 16

Quarter-final

Semi-final

Final

CAF Champions League

Preliminary round

First round

FIFA Club World Cup

Overall statistics
{|class="wikitable" style="text-align: center;"
|-
!
!Total
! Home
! Away
! Neutral
|-
|align=left| Games played || 43 || 19 || 18 || 5
|-
|align=left| Games won || 26 || 15* || 8 || 3
|-
|align=left| Games drawn || 8 || 4 || 3 || 1*
|-
|align=left| Games lost || 9 || 0 || 8 || 1
|-
|align=left| Biggest win || 6 - 0 (vs. Diamond Stars )|| 6 - 0 (vs. Diamond Stars )  || 3 - 1 (vs. FAR Rabat)  ||3 - 1 (vs. Atletico Mineiro ) 
|-
|align=left| Biggest loss ||  0 - 2 (vs. Bayern Munich)   ||  || 1-0 (vs. 8 different teams) || 0 - 2 (vs. Bayern Munich )  
|-
|align=left| Clean sheets || 21 || 13 || 7 || 1
|-
|align=left| Goals scored || 65 || 41 || 17 || 7
|-
|align=left| Goals conceded || 23 || 6 || 12 || 5
|-
|align=left| Goal difference || +42 || +35 || +5 ||+2
|-
|-
|-
|align=left| Winning rate || 26/43 (%) || 15/19 (%) || 8/19 (%) || 3/5* (%)
|-
|align=left| Most appearances || 39 || align=left colspan=3|  Khalid Askri
|-
|align=left| Top scorer || 16 || align=left colspan=3|  Mouhcine Moutouali  
|-

[*] Lost one match on Penalties

Squad statistics

Top scorers

References

Raja CA seasons